Mount Loke is a horn shaped peak on the south wall of Wright Valley, standing between Goodspeed Glacier and Denton Glacier in the Asgard Range of Victoria Land, Antarctica. It was named by the Victoria University of Wellington Antarctic Expedition, 1958–59, after Loki, one of the Norse gods, although it uses an alternate spelling of his name.

References

Mountains of the Asgard Range
McMurdo Dry Valleys